Adam Graf Tarnowski von Tarnów (4 March 1866 – 10 October 1946), was an Austro-Hungarian diplomat of Polish origin during World War I.

Life 
Born in Kraków on 4 March 1866 into an old family of the Polish aristocracy. On 10 September 1901, he married Princess Marie Światopełk-Czetwertyńska (1880–1965) in Warsaw.

Count Tarnowski entered the Austro-Hungarian foreign service in 1897. He was appointed to the Austro-Hungarian Embassy in Washington D.C. in 1899 and remained there until 1901, when he was transferred to Paris. In 1907, he was promoted to Counselor and dispatched to Madrid. In 1909, he was transferred to London.

On 30 April 1911, he was appointed Minister of the Dual Monarchy at Sofia. During the war, he was said to have exerted a major influence on King Ferdinand I and to have played a prominent role in securing Bulgaria's entry into the war on the side of the Central Powers in October 1915.

In late 1915, Dr. Dumba who served as the Austro-Hungarian Ambassador at Washington D.C. was declared persona non grata and expelled from the country. On 9 November 1916, the Austro-Hungarian government decided to appoint Count Tarnowski as his replacement. This was considered a well-suited appointment as he had a reputation of being one of the most accomplished and talented diplomats in the Dual Monarchy's service.

Count Tarnowski only arrived to the United States on 31 January 1917 as Britain first refused to grant him safe conduct to travel through the Entente naval blockade. Furthermore, he arrived on the same day as the German note on the resumption of unrestricted submarine warfare was delivered and President Wilson therefore refused to receive him. Following the U.S. declaration of war with Germany on 8 April, Austria-Hungary decided to break off diplomatic relations which meant that he was never allowed to present his credentials. He sailed from the United States on 4 May together with other diplomatic staff. War was formally declared between the United States and Austria-Hungary in December 1917.

In 1917, Count Tarnowski was considered for nomination as Minister at Stockholm, but as events in his native Poland unfolded he never took up the position. In September 1917, he declined to be a member of the Regency Council of the newly founded Kingdom of Poland, but was later proposed to become the first Prime Minister. However, his nomination was vetoed by Germany due to his alleged pro-Austrian sympathies.

After the war, he retired from public service. His son Adam (1892–1956) was also a diplomat and served briefly as Foreign Minister in the Polish exile government in London after World War II.

Count Tarnowski died in Lausanne on 10 October 1946.

Notes

References

External links
'Adam Tarnowski von Tarnów', Solving Problems Through Force
The Tarnowski Family Association 

1866 births
1946 deaths
Austro-Hungarian diplomats of World War I
Austro-Hungarian diplomats
Austrian diplomats
Polish diplomats
Counts of Poland
Ambassadors of Austria-Hungary to the United States
Adam